Jeremy Scott: The People's Designer is a 2015 documentary film directed by Vlad Yudin detailing the life of American fashion designer Jeremy Scott and his rise in the fashion industry.

The film was released on September 18, 2015. It features appearances by CL from 2NE1, Jared Leto, Miley Cyrus, Rihanna, Lady Gaga, Devon Aoki, Katy Perry, Rita Ora, Paris Hilton, ASAP Rocky, and Nicky Hilton.

Jeremy Scott: The People's Designer was not widely reviewed prior to its initial limited run in theaters. Adam Tschorn of Los Angeles Times was mixed in his review. He highlighted it for "offer[ing] a odd thumbnail sketch of the reigning crown prince of fashion," but predicted Scott's fan to be "frustrated by the film because the brush strokes are broad, and the focus feels more about the scrum and swirl around the man than the man himself".

References

External links 

Jeremy Scott: The People's Designer on Facebook

2015 documentary films
Documentary films about fashion designers
American documentary films
2010s English-language films
2010s American films